The Acqui Award of History (Premio Acqui Storia) is an Italian prize. The prize was founded in 1968 for remembering the victims of the Acqui Military Division who died in Cefalonia (September 13–26, 1943) fighting against the Nazis.  The jury is composed of seven members: six full professors of history and a group of sixty (60) ordinary readers who have just one representative (and just one vote) in the jury. The Acqui Award Prize is divided into three sections: history, popular history, and historical novels.  A special prize entitled “Witness to the Times,” given to individual personalities known for their cultural contributions and who have distinguished themselves in describing historical events and contemporary society, may also be conferred.  Beginning in 2003 special recognition for work in multimedia and iconography--”History through Images”—was instituted.

Winners of the prize
Source: Premio Acqui Storia

History section

1968 - Ivan Palermo - Storia di un armistizio - A. Mondadori
1969 - Nicola Tranfaglia - Carlo Rosselli dall’interventismo a Giustizia e Libertà - Laterza
1970 - Harrison E. Salisbury - I 900 giorni - L’assedio di Leningrado - Bompiani
1971 - Nuto Revelli - L’ultimo Fronte - Einaudi
1972 - Ottavio Bariè - Albertini - Utet
1973 - Karl D. Bracher - La dittatura tedesca - Il Mulino
1974 - Carlo Ghisalberti - Storia costituzionale d’Italia 1849 - 1948 - Laterza
1975 - George L. Mosse - La nazionalizzazione delle masse - Il Mulino
1976 - Giuseppe Boffa - Storia dell’Unione Sovietica - A. Mondadori
1977 - Franco Livorsi - Amadeo Bordiga - Editori Riuniti
1978 - Valerio Castronovo - Il Piemonte - Einaudi
1979 - Nello Ajello - Intellettuali e PCI 1944 - 1958 - Laterza
1980 - Charles S. Maier - La rifondazione dell’Europa borghese - De Donato
1981 - Giorgio Vaccarino - Storia della Resistenza in Europa 1938 - 1945 - Feltrinelli
1982 - Giorgio Candeloro - Il fascismo e le sue guerre 1922 - 1939 - Feltrinelli
1983 - Meir Michaelis - Mussolini e la questione ebraica - Ediz. Comunità
1984 - U.B. Alfassio-Grimaldi e Gherardo Bozzetti - Bissolati Rizzoli
1985 - Francesco Barbagallo - Nitti - Utet
1986 - Ennio Di Nolfo - Le paure e le speranze degli italiani - A. Mondadori
1987 - Giorgio Rochat - Italo Balbo - Utet
1988 - Andrea Riccardi - Il potere del Papa da Pio XII a Paolo VI - Laterza
1989 - Enzo Santarelli - Nenni - Utet
1990 - Paul Kennedy - Ascesa e declino delle grandi potenze - Garzanti
1990 - Mario Isnenghi - Le guerre degli italiani - A. Mondadori
1990 - Arno J. Majer - Soluzione finale - A. Mondadori
1991 - Roberto Vivarelli - Storia delle origini del fascismo - Il Mulino
1991 - Simona Colarizi - L'opinione degli italiani sotto il regime 1929 - 1943 - Laterza
1991 - Carlo Pinzani - Da Roosevelt a Gorbaciov - Ponte alle Grazie
1992 - Claudio Pavone - Una guerra civile 1943 - 1945 - Bollati Boringhieri
1992 - Mimmo Franzinelli - Il riarmo dello spirito - Pagus
1992 - Pietro Scoppola - La repubblica dei partiti - Il Mulino
1993 - Giorgio Spini - Le origini del socialismo - Einaudi
1993 - Michela De Giorgio - Le italiane dall’Unità a oggi - Laterza
1993 - Silvio Lanaro - Storia dell’Italia repubblicana - Marsilio
1994 - Enrico Decleva - Mondadori - Utet
1994 - Victoria De Grazia - Le donne nel regime fascista - Marsilio
1994 - Nicola Labanca - In marcia verso Adua - Einaudi
1995 - Giorgio Borsa - Dieci anni che cambiarono il mondo – Corbaccio

Scientific History
1996 - Raul Hilberg - La distruzione degli ebrei d’Europa – Einaudi
1997 - Guido Melis - Storia dell’Amministrazione Italiana - Il Mulino
1998 – (ex equo) Aga Rossi, Victor Zaslavsky - Togliatti e Stalin - Il Mulino and Maurilio Guasco - La storia del clero – Laterza
1999 - Paul Ginsborg - Storia d’Italia 1943-1996. Famiglia, società, Stato – Einaudi
2000 - Angelo d'Orsi - La cultura a Torino tra le due guerre – Einaudi
2001 - Mark Mazower - Le Ombre dell’Europa. Democrazie e totalitarismi del XX secolo – Garzanti
2002 - Jose Pirjevec - Le guerre Jugoslave – Einaudi
2003 - Walter Russell Mead - Il serpente e la colomba. Storia della politica estera degli Stati-Uniti d’America – Garzanti
2004 - Gaetano Quagliariello - De Gaulle e il gollismo - Il Mulino
2005 - Gabriele Hammermann - Gli internati militari italiani in Germania, 1943-1945 - Il Mulino
2006 - Sergio Soave - Senza tradirsi, senza tradire - Nino Aragno Editore
2007 - Piero Craveri - De Gasperi - Il Mulino
2008 - Raimondo Luraghi - La spada e le magnolie. Il Sud nella storia degli Stati Uniti - Donzelli editore
2009 - Orazio Cancila - I Florio. Storia di una dinastia imprenditoriale – Bompiani
2010 - Alessandro Orsini – Anatomia delle Brigate rosse. Le radici ideologiche del terrorismo rivoluzionario  - Rubbettino (English Version by Cornell University Press: Alessandro Orsini, Anatomy of the Red Brigades. The Religious Mindset of Modern Terrorists)
2011 - Roberto de Mattei - Il Concilio Vaticano II. Una storia mai scritta - Lindau
2012 - Giovanni Tassani - Diplomatico tra due guerre. Vita di Giacomo Paulucci di Calboli Barone - Casa 
2013 - Maurizio Serra - Malaparte. Vite e leggende - Marsilio Editori; Ottavio Barié - Dalla guerra fredda alla grande crisi. Il nuovo mondo delle relazioni internazionali - Il Mulino
2014 - Luciano Mecacci - La Ghirlanda fiorentina e la morte di Giovanni Gentile - Adelphi e Gianpaolo 
2015 - Franco Cardini - L’appetito dell’Imperatore. Storie e sapori segreti della storia - Mondadori e Paolo Isotta - La virtù dell’elefante. La musica, i libri, gli amici e San Gennaro - Marsilio

Popular History

1996 Miriam Mafai - Botteghe oscure, addio - A. Mondadori
1997 Ilaria Porciani - La festa della nazione - Il Mulino
1998 Silvio Bertoldi - Il sangue e gli eroi – Rizzoli
1999 Antonio Gibelli - La grande guerra degli italiani. 1915-1918 – Santoni
2000 Arrigo Petacco - L’esodo - A. Mondadori
2001 Alfio Caruso - Italiani dovete morire – Longanesi
2002 Pasquale Chessa, Francesco Villari - Interpretazioni su Renzo De Felice - Baldini Castoldi
2003 Giampaolo Pansa - I figli dell’Aquila - Sperling & Kupfer
2004 Gian Enrico Rusconi - Cefalonia. Quando gli italiani si battono – Einaudi
2005 :it:Federico Rampini - Il secolo cinese. Storie di uomini, città e denaro dalla fabbrica del mondo – Mondadori
2006 Angelo Del Boca - Italiani, brava gente? - Neri Pozza
2007  - Spingendo la notte più in là – Mondadori
2008 Maurizio Serra - Fratelli Separati. Drieu-Aragon-Malraux Edizioni Settecolori
2009 Roberto Riccardi - Sono stato un numero. Alberto Sed racconta – Giuntina
2010 Marco Patricelli – Il volontario - Laterza
2011 Andrea Vento - In silenzio gioite e soffrite. Storia dei servizi segreti italiani dal Risorgimento alla Guerra fredda - Il Saggiatore
2012 Giancarlo Mazzuca e Luciano Foglietta - Sangue romagnolo. I compagni del Duce - Minerva Edizioni
2013 Giuseppe Marcenaro - Una sconosciuta moralità. Quando Verlaine sparò a Rimbaud - Bompiani
2014 Giancristiano Desiderio - Vita intellettuale e affettiva di Benedetto Croce - Liberilibri
2015 Antonio De Rossi - La costruzione delle Alpi. Immagini e scenari del pittoresco alpino (1773-1914) - Donzelli.

Historical novel

2009 Raffaele Nigro – Santa Maria delle battaglie – Rizzoli
2010 Antonio Pennacchi – Canale Mussolini - Mondadori
2011 Stefano Zecchi - Quando ci batteva forte il cuore - Mondadori
2012 Mauro Mazza - L'albero del mondo. Weimar, ottobre 1942 - Fazi Editore
2013 Dario Fertilio - L’ultima notte dei fratelli Cervi. Un giallo nel triangolo della morte - Marsilio Editori
2014 Vasken Berberian - Sotto un cielo indifferente - Sperling&Kupfer
2015 Licia Giaquinto - La Briganta e lo sparviero - Marsilio

Witness to the Times
 
  Norberto Bobbio
  Giovanni Spadolini
  Altiero Spinelli
  Giulio Andreotti
  Alessandro Galante Garrone
  Giancarlo Pajetta
  Susanna Agnelli
  Carlo Bo
  Vittorio Foa
  Primo Levi
  Cesare Musatti
  Tullio Regge
  Bartolomeo Sorge
  Umberto Veronesi
  Alberto Cavallari
  Luigi Firpo
  Arrigo Levi
  Piero Ottone
  Franco Della Peruta
  Furio Diaz
  Giuseppe Galasso
  Jean Strarobinski
  Luigi Vittorio Ferraris
  Roberto Gaja
  Egidio Ortona
  Sergio Romano
  Natalia Ginzburg
  Rita Levi-Montalcini
  Margherita Hack
  Lalla Romano
  Adriana Zarri
  Enzo Biagi
  Oreste Del Buono
  Giorgio Fattori
  Luigi Ciotti
  Inge Feltrinelli
  Antonio Tabucchi
  Lietta Tornabuoni
  Ernesto Olivero
  Madre Teresa di Calcutta
  Indro Montanelli
  Alberto Sordi
  Cesare Romiti
  Cino Chiodo
  Giovanni Galliano
  Piero Galliano
  Ercole Tasca
  Marcello Venturi
  Giorgio Forattini
  Barbara Spinelli
  Michail Gorbacëv
  Mike Bongiorno
  Francesco Cossiga
  Marcello Lippi
  Gianluigi Buffon
  Nazionale Italiana di Calcio Campione del Mondo 2006 (2006)
  Claudia Cardinale (2007)
  Alberto Bolaffi (2007)
  Mauro Mazza (2007
  Franco Battiato (2008)
  Vittorio Feltri (2008)
  Rino Fisichella (2008)
  Uto Ughi (2008)
  Gianni Letta (2009)
  Alain Elkann (2009)
  Antonio Paolucci (2009)
  Sandro Bondi (2010)
  Vittorio Messori (2010)
  Massimo Ranieri (2010)
  Marcello Veneziani (2011)
  Brunello Cucinelli (2011)
  Ida Magli (2011)
  Ezio Greggio (2011)
  Bruno Vespa (2012)
  Carlo Verdone (2012)
  Maria Gabriella di Savoia (2012)
  Paola Pitagora (2012)
  Pupi Avati (2013)
  Giampaolo Pansa (2013)
  Roberto Napoletano (2013)
  Pier Francesco Pingitore (2013)
  Livio Berruti (2014)
  Lorella Cuccarini (2014)
  Mario Orfeo (2014)
  Enrico Vanzina (2014)
  Dario Ballantini (2015)
  Pietrangelo Buttafuoco (2015)
  Italo Cucci (2015)
  Maria Rita Parsi (2015)
  Antonio Patuelli (2015)

See also

 List of history awards

External links
 

History awards
Italian awards
Awards established in 1968
1968 establishments in Italy
Acqui Terme